The 2015 South Lakeland District Council election took place on 7 May 2015 to elect members of the South Lakeland District Council in England. It was held on the same day as other local elections.

Election results summary

Ward results

Joss Curwen was originally elected as a Conservative councillor.

By-Elections
No by-elections were held between 2015 and 2016.

References

2015 English local elections
May 2015 events in the United Kingdom
2015
2010s in Cumbria